The Lund Grade School, at 30 W Center St. in Lund, Nevada, was listed on the National Register of Historic Places in 2018.

It was built in 1915 and was operated as a school by the White Pine County School District up to 2005.

It is a -story, Craftsman-style schoolhouse located in the middle of Lund.

The nomination to the National Register was authored by Marion Francis of the Lund Historical Society.

References

		
National Register of Historic Places in White Pine County, Nevada
Schools in Nevada
American Craftsman architecture in Nevada
School buildings completed in 1915
1915 establishments in Nevada